Lasnik is a surname. Notable people with the surname include:

Andreas Lasnik (born 1983), Austrian footballer
Howard Lasnik (born 1945), University Professor in the Department of Linguistics at the University of Maryland
Robert S. Lasnik (born 1951), American attorney and jurist